The 4th Tank Battalion "M.O. Passalacqua" is an inactive tank battalion of the Italian Army based in Solbiate Olona in Lombardy. Originally the battalion, like all Italian tank units, was part of the infantry, but since 1 June 1999 it is part of the cavalry. Operationally the battalion was last assigned to the Mechanized Brigade "Legnano".

History 
The battalion was formed during the 1975 army reform: on 30 September 1975 the 3rd Bersaglieri Regiment was disbanded and the next day its IV Tank Battalion became the 4th Tank Battalion "M.O. Passalacqua". As the war flag and traditions of the 3rd Bersaglieri Regiment had been assigned to the 18th Bersaglieri Battalion "Poggio Scanno" the 4th Passalacqua was granted a new war flag on 12 November 1976 by decree 846 of the President of the Italian Republic Giovanni Leone. The battalion received the traditions of the IV Tank Battalion "M", which had been formed by the 32nd Tank Infantry Regiment in spring 1940 and fought as unit of the 31st Tank Infantry Regiment in the Greco-Italian war. In 1942 the IV Tank Battalion was ceded to the 133rd Tank Infantry Regiment, with which it served in the Western Desert Campaign until regiment and battalion were destroyed in the Second Battle of El Alamein. The battalion was officially declared lost on 20 November 1942.

After World War II the IV Tank Battalion was reformed in 1951 as unit of the 31st Tank Regiment, which transferred the battalion on 1 July 1963 to the 3rd Bersaglieri Regiment.

Tank and armored battalions created during the 1975 army reform were all named for officers, soldiers and partisans, who were posthumously awarded Italy's highest military honor the Gold Medal of Military Valour for heroism during World War II. The 4th Tank Battalion's name commemorated 32nd Tank Infantry Regiment Lieutenant Ugo Passalacqua, who had served in the IV Tank Battalion "M" and died on 10 February 1941 of wounds received in battle on 27 January 1941 during the Greco-Italian war. Equipped with Leopard 1A2 main battle tanks the 4th Tank Battalion joined the 3rd Mechanized Brigade "Goito".

After the end of the Cold War the Italian Army began to draw down its forces and when the Goito brigade was disbanded on 1 June 1991 the 4th Tank Battalion and 18th Bersaglieri Battalion joined the Mechanized Brigade "Legnano". On 27 August 1992 the 4th Tank Battalion "M.O. Passalacqua" was disbanded and the next day the battalion's personnel and the personnel of the disbanded  67th Mechanized Infantry Battalion "Montelungo" formed the 67th Armored Infantry Regiment "Legnano". As the new unit continued the traditions of the 67th Infantry Regiment "Legnano" the flag of the 4th Tank Battalion was transferred to the Shrine of the Flags in the Vittoriano in Rome.

See also 
 Mechanized Brigade "Legnano"

References

Tank Battalions of Italy